A doyen is an expert or the senior member of a group. It may also been used to refer to a senior diplomat, usually the head of the diplomatic corps, in its male or female forms: "doyen" or "doyenne".

Doyen may also refer to:

Surname

People 

 Charles A. Doyen (1859–1918), American Marine Corps officer 
 Eugène-Louis Doyen (1859–1916), French surgeon
 Gabriel François Doyen (1726–1806), French painter 
 Gustave Doyen (1827–1923), French painter 
 Louis Doyen, French inventor of Doypack 
 Ross Doyen (1926–2014), American farmer, rancher, and state legislator

Places
 Ouzouer-le-Doyen, village and commune in north central France
 La Ferrière-au-Doyen, village and commune in northwest France

Other
 Doyen (horse), a racehorse
 La Doyenne, a cycle race
 Doyen-class attack transport, active during World War II with the United States Navy
 , various ships of the United States Navy
 Doyen Verlag, an imprint of VDM Publishing